Dr. Andrew N. Robertson (born 1974) is a British actor best remembered for his performances in The Cement Garden and the Gormenghast series. He is also a musician and academic, fronting British band Truck, and has published work on automatic accompaniment for rock music at the conference on New Interfaces for Musical Expression.

In May 2009, Robertson was awarded a research fellowship of the Royal Academy of Engineering for his work on digital music. Robertson was a research student at Queen Mary, University of London at the Centre for Digital Music specialising in interactive real-time musical systems. In January 2011, Robertson developed software called "B-Keeper" which would allow drummers in rock bands to enhance their live performances. Robertson is also a member of a band playing mainly space rock music called Higamos Hogamos which trialled the "B-Keeper" software that he developed.

Selected bibliography
A. Robertson and M. D. Plumbley. Real-time beat-tracker for live performance with drums. To appear in Proceedings of the Digital Music Research Network Summer Conference, Leeds Metropolitan University, UK, 7–8 July 2007.
A. Robertson and M. D. Plumbley. B-Keeper: A beat tracker for live performance. In Proceedings of New Interfaces for Musical Expression (NIME 2007), New York, NY, USA, June 6–10, 2007, pp 234–237, 2007.
A. N. Robertson and M. D. Plumbley. Real-time Interactive Musical Systems: An Overview. In Proceedings of the Digital Music Research Network Doctoral Researchers Conference, London, UK, July 22–23, 2006.

References

External links
 
 Andrew Robertson at Last.fm

1974 births
Living people
British male television actors